MacBeth Mahlangu (born 11 October 2001), is a South African professional soccer player who plays as a defender for TS Galaxy.

References

External links

2001 births
Living people
South African soccer players
Association football defenders
TS Galaxy F.C. players
South African Premier Division players
National First Division players
Footballers at the 2020 Summer Olympics
Olympic soccer players of South Africa